Mario Zanello (22 July 1903 – 25 January 1981) was an Italian association football manager and footballer who played as a defender. He represented the Italy national football team twice, the first being on 23 October 1927, the occasion of a 1927–30 Central European International Cup match against Czechoslovakia in a 2–2 away draw.

Honours

Players
Torino
Coppa Italia: 1935–36

Italy
 Central European International Cup: 1927–30

References

1903 births
1981 deaths
Italian footballers
Italy international footballers
Association football defenders
F.C. Pro Vercelli 1892 players
Torino F.C. players
A.C. Cuneo 1905 managers
People from Vercelli
Italian football managers
Vigevano Calcio players
Vigevano Calcio managers
Footballers from Piedmont
Sportspeople from the Province of Vercelli